Walton Mountain is a mountain located in the Catskill Mountains of New York state, west of Walton. Bullock Hill is located northwest of Walton Mountain, while Clabber Peak is located southwest of it, and Crane Hill is located southeast of it.

References

Mountains of Delaware County, New York
Mountains of New York (state)